Western Australian Local Government Association (WALGA) is an organisation of local government bodies in Western Australia.

It commenced in 2001, as a successor to the Western Australian Municipal Association, Country Shire Councils' Association, and the Local Government Association.
It has lobbied for increased funding for local government at different stages.

Publications

References

External link 
 https://walga.asn.au/About-WALGA  WALGA History

Local_government_in_Western_Australia
Organisations based in Perth, Western Australia
2001 establishments in Australia